Amy Atwell (born 30 June 1998) is an Australian basketball player for the Perth Lynx of the Women's National Basketball League (WNBL). She played college basketball for Hawaii, where she broke numerous 3-point records and won Big West Player of the Year in her senior season. She is the granddaughter of Mal Atwell.

College statistics

Professional career

Los Angeles Sparks 
Atwell was selected by the Los Angeles Sparks in the third round (27th overall) of the 2022 WNBA draft. She made the opening night roster and made her first career start against the Chicago Sky on 6 May. After appearing in four games, Atwell was waived by the Sparks on 7 June 2022.

Perth Lynx 
On 4 June 2022, Atwell signed with the Perth Lynx for the 2022–23 WNBL season.

WNBA career statistics

Regular season

|-
| align="left" | 2022
| align="left" | Los Angeles
| 4 || 1 || 8.0 || .111 || .167 || .000 || 0.5 || 0.5 || 0.0 || 0.0 || 0.5 || 0.8
|-
| align="left" | Career
| align="left" | 1 year, 1 team
| 4 || 1 || 8.0 || .111 || .167 || .000 || 0.5 || 0.5 || 0.0 || 0.0 || 0.5 || 0.8

References

External links 
 
 Hawaii profile

1998 births
Living people
Basketball players from Perth, Western Australia
Forwards (basketball)
Guards (basketball)
Hawaii Rainbow Wahine basketball players
Los Angeles Sparks draft picks
Los Angeles Sparks players